Shaggs' Own Thing is a 1982 compilation album by the American band the Shaggs, containing unreleased recordings made between 1969 and 1975. In 1988, Shaggs' Own Thing and the Shaggs' first album, Philosophy of the World, were remastered and rereleased by Rounder Records as the compilation The Shaggs.

History 

The Shaggs were an American rock band formed in Fremont, New Hampshire, in 1965, at the insistence of their father, Austin Wiggin, who believed that his mother had predicted their rise to fame. In 1969, Austin paid for the Shaggs to record an album, Philosophy of the World, at Fleetwood Studios in Revere, Massachusetts. Though it received no attention on release, during the 1970s it developed a cult following, notable for its lack of technical proficiency, with bizarre melodies and rhythms.

In 1975, Austin took the Shaggs to Fleetwood Studios for another recording session. Though they had become more proficient through hundreds of hours of practice, the engineer wrote: "As the day progressed, I overcame my disappointment and started feeling sorry for this family paying $60 an hour for studio time to record — this?" The recordings went unreleased. Shortly after, Austin died of a heart attack and the Shaggs disbanded.

In 1980, Terry Adams and Tom Ardolino of the American band NRBQ convinced the Shaggs sisters to reissue Philosophy of the World under their record label, Rounder Records. Shaggs' Own Thing, featuring material recorded in the 1975 session, was curated by Adams and Ardolino and released in 1982. In 1988, Philosophy of the World and Shaggs' Own Thing were remastered and rereleased by Rounder Records as the compilation The Shaggs.

Content 
Shaggs' Own Thing contains previously unreleased recordings made between 1969 and 1975. It includes contributions from the Shaggs' father Austin Jr., their younger sister Rachel, and their brother Robert. It also includes several covers of popular songs of the early 1970s, in addition to new original songs and a re-recording of "My Pal Foot Foot" from Philosophy of the World.

Reception 
Shaggs' Own Thing was noted for greater stylistic variety and a higher level of musicianship compared to Philosophy of the World. The title track is a duet between Austin and his eldest son, Robert. Pitchfork described it as "particularly disturbing" and unintentionally Oedipal, noting that Austin sings of catching another man, his son, "doin' it" with "his girl".

Track listing 

12 appears on both the LP and CD reissues; 13-15 are CD only. 13 and 14 are also recordings made circa 1973, and were previously released in 2016 by Light in the Attic as a numbered edition of 3000 7" singles for Record Store Day.

References

References 

 Chusid, Irwin. Songs in the Key of Z: The Curious Universe of Outsider Music. (Chicago) A Cappella, 2000. .

The Shaggs
1982 compilation albums
Rounder Records compilation albums
The Shaggs albums